Dick Whittington and His Cat is a 1950 picture book written and illustrated by Marcia Brown. The book is a retelling of the English folktale of the same name. The book was a recipient of a 1951 Caldecott Honor for its illustrations.

References

1950 children's books
American picture books
Caldecott Honor-winning works